Eutichurus is a genus of spiders in the family Cheiracanthiidae. It was first described in 1897 by Simon. , it contained 32 species found in South America, and two species in India.

Species
Eutichurus comprises the following species:
Eutichurus abiseo Bonaldo, 1994
Eutichurus arnoi Bonaldo, 1994
Eutichurus brescoviti Bonaldo, 1994
Eutichurus chingliputensis Majumder & Tikader, 1991
Eutichurus cumbia Bonaldo & Ramírez, 2018
Eutichurus cuzco Bonaldo, 1994
Eutichurus ferox Simon, 1897
Eutichurus furcifer Kraus, 1955
Eutichurus ibiuna Bonaldo, 1994
Eutichurus itamaraju Bonaldo, 1994
Eutichurus keyserlingi Simon, 1897
Eutichurus lizeri Mello-Leitão, 1938
Eutichurus luridus Simon, 1897
Eutichurus madre Bonaldo, 1994
Eutichurus manu Bonaldo, 1994
Eutichurus marquesae Bonaldo, 1994
Eutichurus murgai Bonaldo & Lise, 2018
Eutichurus nancyae Bonaldo & Saturnino, 2018
Eutichurus pallatanga Bonaldo, 1994
Eutichurus paredesi Bonaldo & Saturnino, 2018
Eutichurus putus O. Pickard-Cambridge, 1898
Eutichurus ravidus Simon, 1897
Eutichurus saylapampa Bonaldo, 1994
Eutichurus sigillatus Chickering, 1937
Eutichurus silvae Bonaldo, 1994
Eutichurus tequendama Bonaldo & Lise, 2018
Eutichurus tezpurensis Biswas, 1991
Eutichurus tropicus (L. Koch, 1866)
Eutichurus valderramai Bonaldo, 1994
Eutichurus yalen Bonaldo, 1994
Eutichurus yungas Bonaldo & Ramírez, 2018
Eutichurus zarate Bonaldo, 1994

References

Cheiracanthiidae
Araneomorphae genera
Spiders of South America
Spiders of the Indian subcontinent